The Tropicana – Las Vegas Boulevard intersection on the Las Vegas Strip (Tropicana Avenue and Las Vegas Boulevard), is noteworthy for several reasons.  It was the first intersection in Las Vegas completely closed to street level pedestrian traffic and its four corners are home to four major resorts: Excalibur Hotel and Casino, Tropicana Las Vegas, New York-New York Hotel and Casino and MGM Grand Las Vegas—the latter has 5,044 rooms and was once the largest hotel in the world. The resorts at the four corners have a total of 12,536 hotel rooms as of 2016.

Tropicana Avenue is also the main local street into Harry Reid International Airport and the first major exit from I-15 to the Strip for traffic heading north from the Los Angeles and San Diego areas. The heavy local traffic on Las Vegas Boulevard, which is listed as a National Scenic Byway All-American Road, further adds to the number of vehicles in this area, making the intersection one of the busiest in the nation.

History

After much study, Clark County officials decided that the only solution to reducing crashes at this intersection that would improve pedestrian and vehicular traffic flow would be to separate the vehicles and pedestrians. Tunnels were considered, but being enclosed and underground posed extra security risks. Thus, uncovered walkways over the streets, using escalators and elevators for access, was selected as the best solution.

Construction began in 1993 on four, open air pedestrian walkways, one bridging each leg of the intersection, with platforms at the ends providing elevator and escalator access between the street and walkway level. The project included barricades between the sidewalks and streets in the vicinity of the intersection, eliminating the at-grade crosswalks.

In 2016 and 2017, the walkways received aesthetic improvements and the escalators were replaced.

References

Transportation in the Las Vegas Valley
Pedestrian bridges in the United States
Las Vegas Strip
Buildings and structures in Clark County, Nevada